Cameron Stewart Baird,  (7 June 1981 – 22 June 2013) was a soldier in the Australian Army who was posthumously awarded the Victoria Cross for Australia, the highest award in the Australian honours system. Baird was the fourth person to receive the Victoria Cross for Australia during Operation Slipper.

Early life
Baird was born in Burnie, Tasmania, on 7 June 1981, the son of Kaye and Doug Baird, a former Carlton Football Club player who, at the time, was coaching the Cooee Football Club. In 1984, Cameron, his parents and older brother Brendan, moved to Victoria and grew up in Gladstone Park, a north western suburb of Melbourne. Baird was educated at Gladstone Views Primary School before completing his Victorian Certificate of Education at Gladstone Park Secondary College.

Baird was a talented junior Australian rules footballer who played with the Calder Cannons and one game for Geelong in the Victorian Football League.  He nominated for the 1999 AFL draft, but suffered a shoulder injury late in the 1999 season, and was not selected by any AFL teams.  He joined the army shortly afterwards.

Military career
Baird joined the Army in January 2000 and upon completion of his initial employment training was posted to the then 4th Battalion (Commando), Royal Australian Regiment, now the 2nd Commando Regiment, in February 2000. After being discharged in 2004, Baird re-enlisted in 2006 and in both periods of service, he was assigned to the 4th Battalion, Royal Australian Regiment (Commando).

Military operations
During Corporal Baird's service in the Australian Army he deployed on the following operations:
 Operation TANAGER (Timor-Leste) – April 2001 – October 2001
 Operation BASTILLE (Iraq) – February 2003 – March 2003
 Operation FALCONER (Iraq) – March 2003 – May 2003
 Operation SLIPPER (Afghanistan) – August 2007 – January 2008
 Operation SLIPPER (Afghanistan) – March 2009 – July 2009
 Operation SLIPPER (Afghanistan) – July 2011 – February 2012
 Operation SLIPPER (Afghanistan) – February 2013 – June 2013.

Medal for Gallantry
In 2007, Baird was awarded the Medal for Gallantry for his actions in a search and clearance operation of a Taliban stronghold.For gallantry in action during close quarters combat in Afghanistan on Operation SLIPPER.Lance Corporal Cameron Stewart Baird was part of a Commando Company mission assigned for clearance and search of a Taliban stronghold in November 2007. During the initial phase of the clearance, Lance Corporal Baird's Platoon came under heavy fire and during the ensuing close-range fire-fight, a member of his team was mortally wounded. Displaying complete disregard for his own safety, Lance Corporal Baird led other members of his team forward under heavy fire from machine guns and assault rifles to recover the wounded team member back to a position of cover.He then re-entered the compound and continued to engage the enemy. Even though under constant fire, Lance Corporal Baird continually moved amongst his team members coordinating their fire, and throwing grenades to neutralise the enemy machine gun positions. Once the close quarter battle had been won, Lance Corporal Baird again led his team forward and began room-to-room clearance, where he was again engaged by several enemies. Lance Corporal Baird continued to lead the fight, killing several enemies and successfully completing the clearance.Throughout the action, Lance Corporal Baird displayed conspicuous gallantry, composure and superior leadership under fire. He was personally responsible for killing several enemy combatants during the clearance, ensuring the momentum of the assault was maintained, and undoubtedly preventing further members of his section from becoming casualties. His performance and his actions were of the highest order and were in the finest traditions of the Australian Army and the Australian Defence Force.

Victoria Cross for Australia

In February 2014, Baird was awarded the Victoria Cross for Australia. Baird was killed in operations in Afghanistan on 22 June 2013. The citation for his Victoria Cross reads:

Legacy
Baird's portrait appears on a 70c Australian postage stamp, in the 2015 'Australian Legends' series. The other four stamps in the series, also all 70c denominations, feature other VC recipients.

Honours and awards

References

1981 births
2013 deaths
Australian Army soldiers
Australian military personnel killed in the War in Afghanistan (2001–2021)
Australian recipients of the Victoria Cross
People from Burnie, Tasmania
Recipients of the Medal for Gallantry
Military personnel from Tasmania
Calder Cannons players
Recipients of the NATO Meritorious Service Medal
People from the City of Hume
Military personnel from Melbourne